Let's Get the Mood Right is the fifth album by the American singer Johnny Gill, released in 1996. Certified gold in January 1997, it was his third and final album for Motown Records.

Track listing

Personnel
Nathan East - bass on "Let's Get the Mood Right"
Babyface, Marc Nelson and Melvin Edmonds - backing vocals on "Let's Get the Mood Right"
Charles Fearing - guitar on "Let's Get the Mood Right"
Tony Rich - backing vocals on "Having Illusions" and "Bring It On"
Nathan Watts - bass overdubs on "It's Your Body"
R. Kelly - backing vocals on "Someone To Love"
LeVar "Lil' Tone" Wilson (nka T.L. Cross) of Ladae! - backing vocals on "4 U Alone"
Stevie Wonder - featured vocals on "Simply Say I Love U" 
Ronnie DeVoe - rap on "So Gentle"

Charts

Weekly charts

Year-end charts

Certifications

References

Johnny Gill albums
1996 albums
Motown albums
Albums produced by Jermaine Dupri
Albums produced by R. Kelly
Albums produced by Troy Taylor (record producer)